John Caryll may refer to:

John Caryll (MP) (c. 1505–66), Member of Parliament for Taunton, Sussex and Lancaster in 1553
John Caryll (senior) (1625–1711), first Baron Caryll of Durford
John Caryll the younger (1667–1736), second Baron Caryll of Durford
John Baptist Caryll (1713–1788), third and last Baron Caryll of Durford

See also
John Carroll (disambiguation)
John Carrell (disambiguation)